John Hasler (born 21 April 1974) is an English actor. He is best known as T-Shirt in the children's television series T-Bag from 1985 to 1992, and for voicing Thomas the Tank Engine in the UK dub of the children's television series Thomas & Friends from 2015 to 2021. Hasler was the only cast member on T-Bag to remain with the show for its entire television run, starting as a young boy and leaving as a teenager.

Career 
John began his career in the mid-1980s. He played T-Shirt, a prominent character in the T-Bag TV series, between 1985–1992, being the only character to star in all nine series and in all four Christmas specials.

He has appeared in Renford Rejects and Casualty and provided voices and additional dialogue replacement (ADR) for a number of film, radio and television productions. He also appeared for an old TV advert for Persil washing powder in the 1990s.

In 2012 he joined the voice cast of Fireman Sam as James Jones, taking over the role from Steven Kynman and Arnold McKinley.

From August 2012 to February 2015, Hasler was cast in the United Kingdom tour of Disney's The Lion King, performing as the meerkat Timon.

In 2015, he became the replacement voice actor of Thomas the Tank Engine in the UK and Rheneas in the UK and US narrations of Thomas & Friends, after Ben Small left the show. He also voices the lead character Trafalgar on Teenage Fairytale Dropouts, protagonist "Toot" in Toot the Tiny Tugboat and Foz in Go Jetters. Hasler left the Thomas and Friends cast after the show ended in 2021, however he continues to voice Thomas in YouTube shorts.

In 2021, Hasler provided the British English voice of Hugo the Jungle Animal in all three films.

Filmography

Film

Television

Video games

References

External links 

1974 births
Living people
20th-century English male actors
21st-century English male actors
English male child actors
English male film actors
English male television actors
English male voice actors
Male actors from London
People from Barking, London